Francisco "Frank" Rivera Santos (October 1, 1930 – August 9, 1993) was a Guamanian politician serving in 12 consecutive Guam Legislatures.

Early life
Francisco Rivera Santos was born , in Guam to Jesus Aflague Santos (1901–1951) and Isabel Rivera Santos (1905–1990). Francisco R. Santos later attended George Washington High School on Guam. Francisco R. Santos had many chances to go to a college but he turned them all down. Soon after high school he met Isabel B. Santos after dating for a while they then got married. Shortly after had five children.

Guam Legislature
Francisco R. Santos ran as a Democrat for a seat the Guam Legislature in 1970 and placed 8th in the General Election, winning a seat in the 11th Guam Legislature. Following his first election, he was reelected 11 times and served until his death in 1993. His son, Francis E. Santos ran for and won his vacated seat.

Elections

Committee leadership
 21st Guam Legislature - Chairman, Committee on Housing, Community Development, Federal and Foreign Affairs

Death
Santos died on August 9, 1993, (age 62) in Los Angeles, California.

References

External links 
 

1930 births
1993 deaths
20th-century American politicians
Chamorro people
Guamanian Democrats
Members of the Legislature of Guam